Stillingia peruviana is a species of flowering plant in the family Euphorbiaceae. It was described in 1951. It is native to Peru.

References

peruviana
Plants described in 1951
Flora of Peru